John Henry Garton (3 October 1941 – 21 July 2016) was a British Anglican bishop and theologian. He was the Principal of Ripon College Cuddesdon from 1986 to 1996, and the suffragan Bishop of Plymouth in the Church of England from 1996 to 2005.

Early life and education
Garton was born on 3 October 1941. He was educated at Worcester College, Oxford and Ripon College Cuddesdon. He completed a short service commission in the Royal Tank Regiment.

Ordained ministry
He was ordained in 1969 and began his career as a Chaplain to the Forces. From 1973 until 1976 he was a lecturer at Lincoln Theological College and then Rector of St Peter's Hillfields. He then spent 10 years as Principal of Ripon College Cuddesdon before his ordination to the episcopate as the Bishop of Plymouth, a position he held from 1996 until 2005, since when he has been an assistant bishop in the Diocese of Oxford.

He died on 21 July 2016 at the age of 74.

References

1941 births
2016 deaths
Alumni of Worcester College, Oxford
Royal Tank Regiment officers
Alumni of Ripon College Cuddesdon
Anglican bishops of Plymouth
20th-century Church of England bishops
21st-century Church of England bishops
Royal Army Chaplains' Department officers
Staff of Ripon College Cuddesdon